Pitcairnia jimenezii is a plant species in the genus Pitcairnia. Native to mild climates, this plant does best in dense rainforest areas.

Cultivars
 Pitcairnia 'Chiamenez'

References
BSI Cultivar Registry Retrieved 11 October 2009
https://www.bromeliads.info/an-introduction-to-pitcairnia/ 

jimenezii